María Angélica Díaz del Campo (born 17 August 1965) is a Mexican politician affiliated with the Party of the Democratic Revolution. As of 2014 she served as Deputy of the LIX Legislature of the Mexican Congress representing the Federal District.

References

1965 births
Living people
Women members of the Chamber of Deputies (Mexico)
Party of the Democratic Revolution politicians
Universidad del Valle de México alumni
21st-century Mexican politicians
21st-century Mexican women politicians
Deputies of the LIX Legislature of Mexico
Members of the Chamber of Deputies (Mexico) for Mexico City